"Mitochondria" is Kenichi Suzumura's third single, released on February 4, 2009. It came with a disc with the PV of the title track "Mitochondria", and peaked at #20 on the Oricon charts.

Track listing

2009 singles
Kenichi Suzumura songs
2009 songs
Lantis (company) singles

ja:風のららら